The Sony Ericsson W595 is a Walkman phone, and is the successor to the Sony Ericsson W580. It was announced on July 22, 2008 alongside the Sony Ericsson S510, Sony Ericsson W302 and Sony Ericsson W902, with the W302 being the low-end, the W595 the mid-range and the W902 the high-end.

Features

Screen
QVGA (320×240) 2.2" 18-bit colour LCD screen

Camera
3.2 megapixel CMOS (2048×1536)
2.5x digital zoom
Video recording: QVGA (320×240) @15fps

Video calling
Video calling is available

Connectivity
Bluetooth
USB 2.0
3G

Pre-installed games
Extreme Air Snowboarding
Guitar Rock Tour
QuadraPop Music
Racing Fever GT

Audio
Walkman 3.0 with Mega Bass (Mega Bass works only with earphones, not on full volume)
MP3, AAC, M4A and MIDI ringtones
FM Radio with RDS, GraceNote Track ID service
Walkman with shake control

Design
7 colours: 'Active Blue', 'Cosmopolitan White', 'Jungle Grey', 'Ruby Black', 'Lava Black', 'Peachy Pink' and 'Sandy Gold'.
There is also a special edition design called 'Floral' (also sometimes referred to as 'Cosmopolitan Flower') which is based on the Cosmopolitan White colour with flowery design.
There is also a second special edition design called 'W595s' which is a blue-white color with a slightly different design and it is exclusive to Orange
There is also a third special edition design called 'W595 Ed Hardy' by Ed Hardy, the famous tattoo designer.

Storage
50 MB internal memory (18MB available to user including all pre-loaded content), 1–4 GB M2 card included, up to 8 GB max.

Key features

Opening
Accessing the battery and/or SIM card slot is not straight-forward. There is a slight gap along the side of the cover, in which you slide a nail to carefully pry the cover off.

References

External links
 Sony Ericsson press release
 Official W595 specifications
 Official W595 specifications for developers
 Sony Ericsson w595 review - Mobile phone review

W595
Mobile phones introduced in 2008